The Rijeka–Pula derby, also called Derby della Učka is the name given to matches between Rijeka and Istra 1961. It is a regional derby between football clubs from Croatia's two largest northern coastal cities, Rijeka and Pula. The teams are supported by their fanbases called Rijeka's Armada and Pula's Demoni.

History
The rivalry between Rijeka and Pula dates back to the days of Kingdom of Italy in the early 1920s, when numerous clubs from Fiume (Rijeka) and Pola (Pula) met at various levels of the Italian league system. The first official match between Rijeka and Pula took place on 25 June 1920, between Juventus Enea Fiume and US Polese. While numerous Rijeka/Fiume (Juventus Enea, CS Olympia, CS Gloria, CS Fiume, Veloce, Magazzini Generali) and Pula/Pola (Polese, Grion, Edera) regularly met during this period, the most notable rivalry existed between the main club of each city, U.S. Fiumana (successor of Olympia and Gloria after 1926) and G.S.F. Giovanni Grion Pola. Between 1930 and 1943, these two clubs played 20 official matches, with Fiumana winning 11 and Grion 5 matches, alongside 4 draws.

Following the end of World War II, the two cities became part of the Yugoslavia. Like all clubs in Yugoslavia, U.S. Fiumana  got restructured into the more proletarian-friendly brand S.C.F. Quarnero in July 1946. The new regime decided to invite a club from the occupied Julian March for the 1946–47 Yugoslav First League and Quarnero was admitted after beating the short-lived Pula-based club USO (Unione Sportiva Operaia) in a two-legged play-off in August 1946. In late 1947 USO merged with another local club to form NK Pula, which survives today as NK Istra. The Quarnero was renamed to NK Rijeka in June 1954. During this period Rijeka spent most seasons playing in the Yugoslav First League, while Pula clubs played in the lower tiers. Until the break-up of Yugoslavia in 1991, Rijeka played 21 official fixtures against Istra and Uljanik, mainly during its stay in the lower divisions in the 1950s and early 1970s, and in the 1973 and 1978–79 Yugoslav Cup. Two other clubs from Rijeka, NK Orijent and NK Lučki Radnik met more frequently Istra and Uljanik in the lower tiers of Yugoslav football.

Since Croatian independence, Istra joined Croatia's top tier and local derbies became a regular feature. Between 1992 and 2000, Rijeka and Istra met on 17 occasions, with Rijeka winning on 8 and Istra on 6 occasions, while 3 matches finished in a draw. Pula did not have a top-tier club between 2000 and 2004. In 2004, NK Pula 1856, former Uljanik, was promoted to Prva HNL. In 2005, the club was renamed to NK Pula Staro Češko, in 2006 to NK Pula and, finally, in summer 2007 to NK Istra 1961. Since July 2004, Istra 1961 and Rijeka have played 55 regional derbies, with Rijeka winning 37 and Istra 1961 5 games, while 13 matches ended in a draw.

Results

Last updated on 2 April 2022.

List of matches

Key

Note: Home team's score always shown first

1992–2000

2004–present

Players

Top scorers
Updated up to the last derby played on 2 April 2022.

9 goals
 Antonio Čolak (Rijeka)

7 goals
 Robert Murić (Rijeka)

6 goals
 Franko Andrijašević (Rijeka)
 Andrej Kramarić (Rijeka)

5 goals
 Alexander Gorgon (Rijeka)
 Borimir Perković (Rijeka)

4 goals
 Gedeon Guzina (Istra 1961)
 Ivan Krstanović (Rijeka)
 Domagoj Pavičić (Rijeka)
 Marin Tomasov (Rijeka)

3 goals
 Leon Benko (Rijeka)
 Roman Bezjak (Rijeka)
 Senad Brkić (Rijeka)
 Josip Drmić (Rijeka)
 Héber (Rijeka)
 Josip Jerneić (Istra 1961)
 Zoran Kvržić (Rijeka)
 Dean Ljubančić (Rijeka)
 Asim Šehić (Istra 1961)
 Haris Vučkić (Rijeka)

Players who have scored in Rijeka–Pula derby for both clubs
Sandi Križman (2 goals, 1 for Rijeka and 1 for Istra 1961)

Players who have played for both clubs (senior career)

Boško Anić
Mateo Bertoša
Dario Bodrušić
Fausto Budicin
Denis Bušnja
Igor Čagalj
Matko Djarmati
Sandi Dobrić
Mate Dragičević
João Escoval
Marin Grujević
Nedim Halilović
Darko Horvat
Dani Iglesias
Elmir Imširević
Vanja Iveša
Sergej Jakirović
Josip Jerneić
Redi Jupi
Irenko Jurić
Jurica Karabatić
Ilija Kljajić

Damir Knežević
Saša Kolić
Fabijan Komljenović
Ljupko Kontešić
Sandi Križman
Ivan Kurtović
Siniša Linić
Robert Lisjak
Josip Lukunić
Admir Malkić
Ivan Mance
Luka Marić
Bernardo Matić
Andréa Mbuyi-Mutombo
Marin Mikac
Mato Miloš
Ivan Močinić
Alen Pamić
Manuel Pamić
Branko Panić
Goran Paracki
Dalibor Pauletić

Renato Pilipović
Andrej Prskalo
Natko Rački
Dragan Raković
Zedi Ramadani
Ivan Rodić
Elvis Scoria
Ahmad Sharbini
Dalibor Starčević
Valentino Stepčić
Andro Švrljuga
Dragan Tadić
Goran Vincetić
Luka Vučko
Matej Vuk
Neven Vukman
Ivor Weitzer
Zoran Zekić
Damir Zlomislić
Andrej Živković

Managers who have managed both clubs
Milivoj Bračun
Nenad Gračan
Srećko Juričić
Robert Rubčić
Elvis Scoria
Zoran Vulić

Prva HNL results

The table lists the place each team took in each of the seasons.

See also
Eternal derby
Adriatic derby
Dinamo–Rijeka derby

References

External links
History of Rijeka's participation in championships at NK-Rijeka.hr 

derby
NK Istra 1961
Football derbies in Croatia